The Richard C. Napier House is a historic two-storey house in Charlotte, Tennessee, U.S.. It was built circa 1800 for Colonel Richard Napier, Sr. It was designed in the Federal architectural style. In 1823, it was inherited by his son, Richard C. Napier, an ironmaster. It has been listed on the National Register of Historic Places since July 26, 1988.

References

Houses on the National Register of Historic Places in Tennessee
Federal architecture in Tennessee
Buildings and structures in Dickson County, Tennessee